Nadim Tabet (born 1982), is a Lebanese filmmaker. He is best known as the director of critically acclaimed film One of These Days.

Personal life
He was born in 1982 in Beirut, Lebanon.

Career
Since young age, he had the fond of making films. He started film shooting with two short fictions in video, first one Caravane in 1997 and then Kodak Color in 1998. Then he moved to France in 1999 to pursue his studies in human sciences and cinema at the Sorbonne University. In the meantime, he directs shorts Histoires extraordinaires du cinématographe in 1999. He continued to directed shorts in following years, such as Martine et Alia  in 2001, Passé présent futur in 2002, and L’Arche de Noé in 2003. In 2005, he made the short Violante and, short Le Liban en automne in 2006. Both of them received good reviews and Tabet made his next short Jeunes et innocents in 2007. Then in 2008 he made Spring 75 and Souvenirs d’un été in 2011. In 2014, he made the critically acclaimed short Eté 91.

In 2001, Tabet co-founded the Lebanese Film Festival. Since 2011, he became a member of the selection committee of the Oberhausen International Short Film Festival. After making several critically acclaimed shorts, he directed his maiden feature film One of These Days in 2017. the film later won the award for the Best Debut Feature at the 22nd Arab Film Festival. In 2019, he co-directed the series Faraya along with another Lebanese filmmaker Mounia Akl.

Filmography

See also
 Cinema of Africa

References

External links
 
 Under Construction by Nadim Tabet – Lebanon
 One of These Days

Living people
Lebanese film directors
1982 births